Elizabeth Johnston Patterson (November 18, 1939 – November 10, 2018) was an American politician from South Carolina. A member of the Democratic Party, she was a three-term member of the United States House of Representatives from 1987 to 1993.

Early life and education
Elizabeth Johnston, known as "Liz", was born into a Democratic political family. Her father, Olin D. Johnston, was Governor of South Carolina from 1935 to 1939 and again from 1943 to 1945. He then served in the United States Senate from 1945 until  his death in 1965.

Her family lived outside Washington, D.C. in Kensington, Maryland, where she grew up during those years. She returned to South Carolina for college, graduating from Columbia College and doing graduate work at the University of South Carolina.

Career
Early in her career, Johnston worked in Washington, D.C. for the Peace Corps and the Office of Economic Opportunity during the administration of President Lyndon B. Johnson. Patterson also worked as the South Carolina director of the Head Start Program and as an assistant to Congressman James R. Mann.

She returned to live in Spartanburg County, where she was elected to the County Council, serving from 1975 to 1976. In 1978 she was elected to the South Carolina State Senate, serving from 1979 to 1986. She was the second woman in the South Carolina Senate, after Mary Gordon Ellis.

In 1986 Patterson was elected to the U.S. House of Representatives from South Carolina's 4th congressional district in 1986, succeeding Carroll A. Campbell Jr., who had given up the seat to make a successful run for governor of South Carolina. She narrowly defeated Bill Workman, the mayor of Greenville, despite Campbell's presence at the top of the Republican ticket. Patterson was the first woman elected to Congress from South Carolina in her own right; the previous three, Elizabeth Hawley Gasque, Willa L. Fulmer, and Corinne Boyd Riley, had been elected in special elections after their husbands had died in office. She served on the House committees on Banking and Veterans Affairs, as well as the Select Committee on Hunger.

Bill Workman's father, W. D. Workman Jr., a journalist and author, had been her father's Republican opponent in the 1962 general election, when Johnston won his last term in the U.S. Senate.

Patterson was narrowly reelected in 1988, when she defeated Republican attorney and city councilman Knox H. White. George H. W. Bush carried the 4th district by the largest margin in the state. She won a third term with a greater margin in 1990 over Terry Haskins, a state Representative from Greenville. That year Campbell, as the Republican incumbent, won reelection as governor in a landslide.

Although Patterson represented a district that had been trending Republican for some time, she was thought to be a fairly secure incumbent, given her family ties and her victory in three successive elections under difficult conditions. She was narrowly defeated for re-election in 1992 by Republican Bob Inglis, an attorney who had never run for office before. As in 1988, George H. W. Bush carried the 4th with his largest margin in the state. After Patterson left office in 1993, no woman would serve in Congress from South Carolina until 2021, when Nancy Mace took office following her defeat of Joe Cunningham in 2020, and Democrats have only tallied more than 40 percent in the 4th district once since 1992.

Patterson was the unsuccessful Democratic nominee for Lieutenant Governor of South Carolina in 1994. She taught political science at Spartanburg Methodist College, as well as being on the board of trustees, and was the chairwoman of the Spartanburg County Democratic Party.

Paterson died on November 10, 2018, just eight days shy of her 79th birthday.

See also
Women in the United States House of Representatives

References

External links
 Elizabeth "Liz" Patterson Papers at South Carolina Political Collections, University of South Carolina

 South Carolina Legislative Manual.

|-

|-

1939 births
2018 deaths
County council members in South Carolina
Democratic Party South Carolina state senators
Female members of the United States House of Representatives
Women state legislators in South Carolina
Peace Corps people
University of South Carolina alumni
Columbia College (South Carolina) alumni
Democratic Party members of the United States House of Representatives from South Carolina
21st-century American women
Women in the South Carolina State Senate